McNeal is an unincorporated community and census-designated place in Cochise County, Arizona, United States. As of the 2010 United States Census it had a population of 238. McNeal has the United States Postal Service zip code of 85617.

Demographics

Climate
According to the Köppen Climate Classification system, McNeal has a semi-arid climate, abbreviated "BSk" on climate maps.

References

Unincorporated communities in Cochise County, Arizona
Unincorporated communities in Arizona